Frizington railway station was built by the Whitehaven, Cleator and Egremont Railway. It served the industrial Parkside area of Frizington, Cumbria, England.

History
The line was one of the fruits of the rapid industrialisation of West Cumberland in the second half of the nineteenth century. The station opened to passengers on 1 July 1857 as the latest railhead on the line being developed from Moor Row to Rowrah.

The station closed with the steep decline of the area's industrial fortunes in the Twentieth Century.

Services
Whilst some Whitehaven, Cleator and Egremont Railway (WCER) mineral, goods and passenger traffic to and from Rowrah passed north along the line to Marron Junction, the greater part arrived and left southwards towards Moor Row and therefore passed through Frizington. Mineral traffic was also generated locally from the quarries and mines such as the Holebeck, Parkside and Crossgill workings on branches within sight of the station.

In 1922 seven all stations passenger trains called at Frizington in each direction, with an extra on Whitehaven Market Day. Four were Rowrah to Whitehaven services, the other three plied a long, circuitous route between Workington Main and Whitehaven via Camerton, Marron Junction, Ullock, Rowrah and Moor Row.

Frizington station's owning Whitehaven, Cleator and Egremont company was taken over by the LNWR and Furness Railway in 1879 as a Joint Line, whereafter the passenger traffic through the station was usually worked by the LNWR.

Goods traffic typically consisted of a two daily turns Up and Down.

Mineral traffic was the dominant flow, though this was subject to considerable fluctuation with trade cycles. Stations and signalling along the line south of Rowrah were changed during the Joint regime to conform to Furness Railway standards.

Rundown and closure
The station closed on 13 April 1931 when normal passenger traffic ended along the line, though workmen's trains were reinstated in March 1940, only to be withdrawn a month later. An enthusiasts' special ran through on 5 September 1954. After scant occasional use the line northwards from Rowrah was abandoned in 1960 and subsequently lifted.

The line southwards from Rowrah through Frizington lead a charmed life, continuing with a limestone flow from a quarry at Rowrah until 1978, after which all traffic ceased and the tracks were lifted.

Afterlife
By 2008 Frizington station house was a private residence. The trackbed had been transformed into part of National Cycle Route 71.

See also

 Furness Railway
 Cleator and Workington Junction Railway

References

Sources

Further reading

External links
Map of the line with photos, via RAILSCOT
The station on overlain OS maps surveyed from 1898, via National Library of Scotland
The closed station on a 1948 OS Map, via npe maps
The station, via Rail Map Online
The railways of Cumbria, via Cumbrian Railways Association
Photos of Cumbrian railways, via Cumbrian Railways Association
The railways of Cumbria, via Railways_of_Cumbria
Cumbrian Industrial History, via Cumbria Industrial History Society
The line's and station's Engineer's Line References, via railwaycodes.org.uk
Furness Railtour using many West Cumberland lines 5 September 1954, via sixbellsjunction
A video tour-de-force of the region's closed lines, via cumbriafilmarchive
1882 RCH Diagram showing the station, see page 173 of the pdf, via google
Haematite, via earthminerals

Disused railway stations in Cumbria
Railway stations in Great Britain opened in 1857
Railway stations in Great Britain closed in 1931
1857 establishments in England